The Nokia N80 is a 3G smartphone from Nokia announced on November 2, 2005, part of the multimedia Nseries line. It runs on Symbian OS v9.1 and the S60 3rd Edition interface. It was first released in June 2006.

It has support for high-speed UMTS/WCDMA connections. Features include a 3.1-megapixel camera (interpolated from 2.0-megapixels) with built-in flash, a front camera for videoconferencing, Wi-Fi (802.11g), Universal Plug and Play (UPnP), FM radio, Bluetooth 1.2, MiniSD memory card slot, and support for 3D Java games. Its 2.1-inch display has a pixel density of 259 ppi due to the 352x416 resolution on a 2.1" displaymaking it one of Nokia's sharpest displays of 2005 and 2006.

The N80 was the world's first UPnP-compatible phone, allowing the transfer of media files to compatible devices over Wi-Fi. The N80 was officially described as a multimedia computer by Nokia, like its successor Nokia N95.

Versions 

 WCDMA/UMTS 2100 MHz for Europe/Asia.
 "Internet Edition" which is available in both US and European Versions.

Bluetooth 
Nokia originally announced the N80 as supporting Bluetooth 2.0, however it was released with Bluetooth 1.2. Therefore, the N80 does not currently support stereo playback over Bluetooth.

Specification sheet

Internet Edition 
The Nokia N80 Internet Edition was a second version of this handset with the same hardware as the normal N80. It has been released in Q4 of 2006 and is available in Patina Bronze or Pearl Black, and has the following additional software included. As of January 2007, the Pearl Black model was available for sale in the US for $499.

 Flickr
 'Download!' App management
 Internet Telephone – SIP VOIP Frontend
 WLAN Wizard

Nokia have now announced that the new Internet Edition firmware is available for the 'classic' N80 by using Nokia Official Software Updater, downloadable from Nokia.com.

Before the Internet Edition firmware was made available on the Nokia Software Updater, end users could update the N80 to the same specification as an N80 Internet Edition by flashing the N80 with the firmware from the N80 Internet Edition. This required the use of several hacked Nokia servicing software applications, including the Phoenix Service Software (or Nokia Software Update with Nemesis (by changing product code)). This method is of questionable legality in some jurisdictions, and may violate the terms of the phone's warranty. There are reports of the occasional failure of this method due to user error or for other unknown reasons, leaving the phone in an unusable state from which only a properly-equipped service center could recover it.

See also 
 List of Nokia products

References

External links 

 Nokia N80 Product Page
 Nokia N80 Details
 Bluetooth Qualification Program specifications

Reviews 
 Review by MobileReview.com
 Review by GSM Arena
 Review by MobileBurn.com
 Review by All About Symbian
 Review by PhoneArena.com
 Reviews by CNET: Asia, Australia U.S.A.

Nokia Nseries
Mobile phones introduced in 2005
Mobile phones with infrared transmitter
Slider phones